Zain Javadd Malik (born 12 January 1993), known mononymously as Zayn, is a British singer. Zayn auditioned as a solo contestant for the British music competition television series The X Factor in 2010. After being eliminated, he was brought back to the competition to form the five-piece boy band One Direction, which went on to become one of the best-selling boy bands of all time. He left the group in March 2015 and signed a solo recording contract with RCA Records.

Adopting a more alternative R&B music style on his first solo studio album, Mind of Mine (2016), and its lead single, "Pillowtalk", he became the first British male artist to debut at number one in both the UK and US with his debut single and album. His subsequent collaborative singles "I Don't Wanna Live Forever" with Taylor Swift and "Dusk Till Dawn" featuring Sia were met with international success. He released his second studio album, Icarus Falls, in 2018, followed by his third album, Nobody Is Listening, in 2021.

Zayn has received several accolades, including an American Music Award and a MTV Video Music Award. He is the only artist to have won the Billboard Music Award for New Artist of the Year twice, receiving it once as a member of One Direction in 2013 and again in 2017 as a soloist.

Early life
Zayn Malik was born Zain Javadd Malik on 12 January 1993 in Bradford, West Yorkshire, to an immigrant Pakistani Muslim father, Yaser Malik, and a White British mother of English and Irish descent, Trisha Malik (née Brannan), who converted to Islam upon marriage. Malik has one older sister, Doniya, and two younger sisters, Waliyha and Safaa. Despite having an Islamic upbringing, he no longer identifies as a Muslim.

Malik grew up in East Bowling, Bradford, in a working-class family and neighbourhood. He attended Lower Fields Primary School and Tong High School (now Tong Leadership Academy) in Bradford. As a teenager, he took performing arts courses and appeared in school productions. He grew up listening to his father's urban music records, primarily R&B, hip hop, and reggae. He wrote raps when he was at school and sang on stage for the first time when singer Jay Sean visited his school. Malik also boxed for two years, from ages 15 to 17. Before beginning his music career, he intended to pursue an academic degree in English in hopes of becoming an English teacher.

Career

2010–2015: The X Factor and One Direction

In 2010, 17-year-old Malik auditioned in Manchester for the seventh series of reality television competition The X Factor. On the morning of the audition, Malik became nervous and did not want to attend, but his mother eventually forced him out of bed and coaxed him into going. He sang "Let Me Love You" by Mario as his audition song and was accepted into the next round. Upon auditioning for The X Factor, Malik stated that he was "looking for an experience". Despite being eliminated before the final round of the competition, judges Nicole Scherzinger and Simon Cowell grouped him with fellow competitors Harry Styles, Niall Horan, Liam Payne and Louis Tomlinson to form a new act for the remainder of the show, the boy band that would become known as One Direction. The group quickly gained popularity in the UK, finished in third place, and were subsequently signed by Cowell to a reported £2 million Syco Records recording contract. They signed in North America with Columbia Records.

A book licensed by One Direction, One Direction: Forever Young (Our Official X Factor Story), released in February 2011 and topped The Sunday Times''' Best Seller list. The same month, the boy band performed for 500,000 people throughout the UK as part of the X Factor Live Tour. The group's debut studio album Up All Night was released in November 2011 in the UK and Ireland. Released internationally in March 2012, they became the first UK group to have their debut album reach number one in the United States. It topped the charts in 16 countries. The lead single, "What Makes You Beautiful", was an international commercial success, reaching number one in the UK and number four in the US; it has since been certified four and six times platinum in the US and Australia, respectively. Subsequent singles "Gotta Be You" and "One Thing" became top ten hits in the UK. Following the release of the album, the band embarked on the Up All Night Tour. Initially intended to be solely a UK tour, dates in North America and Australia were added due to demand. Up All Night: The Live Tour, a video album documenting the tour, was released in May 2012. That same month, One Direction's first book to be licensed in America, Dare to Dream: Life as One Direction, was published and topped The New York Times Best Seller list.

In September 2012, One Direction released "Live While We're Young", the lead single from their second album, and it reached the top ten in almost every country it charted in and recorded the highest one-week opening sales figure for a song by a non-US artist in the US at the time. The album's second single, "Little Things", spawned the band's second number-one single in the UK. One Direction's second studio album, Take Me Home, was released in November 2012. The record sold 540,000 copies in its first week in the US and went to number one in 35 countries. Reaching number one on the Billboard 200, the group became the first boy band in US chart history to record two number-one albums in the same calendar year and the first group since 2008 to record two number-one albums in the same year. The group headlined their second concert tour, the Take Me Home Tour, in February 2013, playing over 100 shows in Europe, North America, Oceania, and Asia. The tour was commercially successful, grossing $114 million. In August 2013, the 3D documentary concert film One Direction: This Is Us was released, accumulating a box office gross of $68.5 million. One Direction's third book, One Direction: Where We Are: Our Band, Our Story: 100% Official, was released that same month.

In November 2013, the band's third studio album, Midnight Memories, was released. It was the best-selling album worldwide in 2013, with four million copies sold globally. The album's number one debut on Billboard 200 made One Direction the first band in history to have their first three albums all debut atop the chart. The album's lead single, "Best Song Ever", became the group's highest-charting single in the US to date. They embarked on the Where We Are Tour, their first all-stadium tour, in 2014; tickets sold out in minutes, and more shows were added due to "overwhelming demand". The band averaged 49,848 fans per show on the tour, which grossed over $290 million and was the highest-grossing tour of 2014, the 15th highest-grossing concert tour of all time, and remains the highest-grossing tour of all time by a vocal group. In September 2014, One Direction's fourth book, One Direction: Who We Are: Our Official Autobiography, was released. The group's second concert film, One Direction: Where We Are – The Concert Film, was released in October 2014.

In November 2014, the group's fourth album, Four, was released. The album was their fourth consecutive number-one album, debuting at number one in 18 countries and selling 3.2 million copies. Singles "Steal My Girl" and "Night Changes" both achieved platinum status in the US, among other countries. In 2015, the group began the On The Road Again Tour. On 18 March 2015, following the band's 16th show of the tour, it was announced that Malik had become overwhelmed with stress and would be absent for the remaining shows of the Asian leg of the tour. 

One week later, on 25 March 2015, the band announced his departure. In the band's official statement, Malik cited his desire to live as a "normal 22-year-old who is able to relax and have some private time out of the spotlight", and denied rumours of any rift between the members, explaining that they had been supportive of the decision. However, in a December 2015 interview with The Fader, Malik expressed that he was unhappy with the group's musical direction, noting that "there was never any room for me to experiment creatively in the band" and "if I would sing a hook or a verse slightly R&B, or slightly myself, it would always be recorded 50 times until there was a straight version that was pop, generic as f—, so they could use that version". In an interview given to Apple Music the next month, Malik stated that "I think I always wanted to go, from like the first year" and "I never really wanted to be there, like in the band. I just gave it a go because it was there at the time ... I instantly realized it wasn’t for me, because I realized I couldn’t put any input in".

2015–2017: Mind of Mine

In March 2015, Malik was seen at a London recording studio with producer Naughty Boy. Following his departure from One Direction, Malik alluded to the potential of a solo career, with the release of his first solo studio album to be released under the Syco label in 2016. The same month, Naughty Boy released on SoundCloud an early demo of Malik's song "I Won't Mind". In June 2015, UK rapper Mic Righteous leaked Malik's "No Type", featuring Mic Righteous and produced by Naughty Boy, a cover version of Rae Sremmurd's hip hop song. Malik also worked with grime rappers Krept & Konan during this time. The material was never released after Malik parted ways with Naughty Boy. Though unreleased, his work with Naughty Boy and Krept & Konan helped Malik gain a new urban audience in the UK.

By July 2015, Malik announced he had signed a recording deal with RCA Records. Later that year, Malik gave several interviews to discuss his debut solo studio album and revealed part of the track list. Talking with The Fader, he stated "life experiences have been the influences for the album and just stuff that I've been through, especially in the last five years". In a conversation with Billboard, Malik's main collaborator for the album James "Malay" Ho said they went to unusual lengths in pursuit of inspiration during recording sessions, for one "we went camping for a week in the Angeles Forest – set up a generator and a tent so we could track in the woods." In his first solo on-camera interview with Zane Lowe for Apple Music's Beats 1, Malik revealed Mind of Mine as the album's title.

The album's lead single, "Pillowtalk", was released in January 2016. The song debuted at number one in numerous countries, including on the UK Singles Chart and the US Billboard Hot 100; on the latter, it became the 25th song to debut at number one, making him the first UK artist to debut at number one on the Hot 100 with a debut single. The chart performance of "Pillowtalk" propelled Malik to number six on the Billboard Artist 100 chart. Worldwide, he broke records for the highest first-day and weekly streams for a debut artist. The album's second official single, "Like I Would", reached number one on Billboard's Dance Club Songs chart. The end of February 2016 saw Malik release a remix of "Pillowtalk" featuring American rapper Lil Wayne and contribute guest vocals to the remix of Chris Brown's R&B song "Back to Sleep", which also featured Usher.Mind of Mine was released in March 2016 and includes songs co-written by Malik, whittled down from 46 tracks he reportedly considered; one of the songs on the album features American R&B singer-songwriter Kehlani. Primarily R&B and alternative R&B, the album blends elements from a number of genres. Despite the variations in sound and genre, Mind of Mine was structured in an "album-as-complete-work" form, maintaining a tightly knit cohesion throughout the record, with an almost seamless transition between and across songs, while maintaining a recognizable, mostly downbeat, "hazy" tone throughout. This gave the album a continuous flow the impression that it all came from one person's "mind". It received generally positive reviews, with praise for Malik's new musical direction, his vocals, and the production.Mind of Mine debuted at number one in a number of countries, including the United Kingdom, Australia, Canada, New Zealand, Norway, Sweden, and United States, where he became the first British male solo artist to debut at number one with his first album. Zayn debuted atop the US Billboard 200 earning 157,000 equivalent album units in its first week, with 112,000 coming from pure album sales. Zayn also became the first British male artist to debut at number one in both the UK and US and the third artist to debut at number one on both the Billboard 200 and Hot 100 with debut entries on each chart (along with Lauryn Hill and Clay Aiken). He also topped the Billboard Artist 100 chart, surpassing One Direction's number-two peak on the chart.

The promotional tour for Mind of Mine included his second solo appearance on The Tonight Show Starring Jimmy Fallon, performances on the Honda Stage at the iHeartRadio Theater and the 3rd iHeartRadio Music Awards. In July 2016, "Cruel", featuring Malik, was released by British production team Snakehips. By the end of 2016, Taylor Swift and Malik released a single together called "I Don't Wanna Live Forever" for the soundtrack of the film Fifty Shades Darker (2017); the song reached number two in the US, number five in the UK, and number one in Sweden. He wrote an autobiography titled Zayn during this time, describing the writing process "therapeutic".

2017–2018: Icarus Falls
On 24 March 2017, Malik released the single "Still Got Time", featuring PartyNextDoor. Malik announced the new single "Dusk Till Dawn", featuring Sia, through his social media. The single was released on 7 September 2017, and an accompanying music video featured American actress Jemima Kirke, directed by Marc Webb. Malik continued to release songs from his upcoming second album without announcing its release date and name.

On 12 April 2018, Malik released the lead from the album, "Let Me". The second single, "Entertainer", was released on 23 May. He released the third single from the album, "Sour Diesel", on 18 July. On 2 August, Malik released another track for the album titled "Too Much", featuring Timbaland. "Fingers" served as the fifth single and was released on 18 October. He and rapper Nicki Minaj collaborated on "No Candle No Light" as the sixth single and final official single from the album, released on 15 November. On 30 November, Malik finally announced that his second solo studio album would be titled Icarus Falls and released its first promotional single, "Rainberry". On 6 December, he released the second promotional single, "Good Years", and on 11 December, he released the album's final promotional and pre-release single, "There You Are". Icarus Falls was released on 14 December, containing 27 tracks, including six previously released singles; "Still Got Time" and "Dusk Till Dawn" were only featured on the Japanese edition of the album. The album received generally favorable reviews from music critics but was not as commercially successful as his previous album. Icarus Falls peaked at 61 on the US Billboard 200 and 77 on the UK Albums Chart. On 28 August 2020, he re-released the album, including "Still Got Time" and "Dusk Till Dawn".

2019–present: Collaborations and Nobody Is Listening
In 2019, Malik performed a cover version of "A Whole New World" with Zhavia Ward for the soundtrack to the 2019 film remake Aladdin. A bilingual English and Spanish version, "Un Mundo Ideal", performed by Malik and Becky G, was released on 17 May. He performed a full Spanish version with Aitana. On 26 September, Malik and indie pop trio Shaed released a remix of the latter's song "Trampoline", with Malik contributing vocals. He followed this with another collaboration, the electropop track "Flames", which he wrote and recorded with Dutch DJ and producer R3hab and British DJ Jungleboi. The song was released on 15 November.

On 25 September 2020, Malik released the single "Better" as the lead single from his third studio album Nobody Is Listening. The song was his first solo release in nearly two years. Malik described the album as "his most personal project to date". Another song, "Vibez", was released along with the album pre-order on 8 January 2021. The album was released one week later, on 15 January.

On 13 September 2021, Malik released a collection of three songs—"Grimez", "Believe Me" and "47 11"—together dubbed Yellow Tape via Dropbox. The tracks' embrace of the old-school hip-hop sound marked a change in his musical direction. In October 2021, RCA dropped Malik from their label.

Other ventures
Fashion
In 2016, Malik made his debut on The Business of Fashion's annual BoF500 index, which profiles the most influential people in fashion. In January 2017, he released a shoe line with Italian footwear designer Giuseppe Zanotti. The Giuseppe for Zayn capsule collection featured four shoe styles: two boots and two sneakers. In February 2017, the Versus (Versace) Spring Summer 2017 campaign featuring Malik and model Adwoah Aboah was released. In the same month, he co-hosted the CFDA/Vogue Fashion Fund's Americans in Paris annual cocktail during Paris Fashion Week. Donatella Versace, chief designer of Versace, appointed Malik as the creative director for a men's and women's capsule collection called Zayn x Versus, which was made available in May 2017.

In September 2018, Malik designed a backpack line for The Kooples. He modeled for Penshoppe in their Spring 2018 and 2019 campaigns. He also modeled for Martyre, which was founded by Anwar Hadid, the brother of Malik's then-girlfriend Gigi.

Philanthropy and activism
Malik is an official ambassador of the British Asian Trust charity group, which aims to improve the lives of disadvantaged people in South Asia. With his former group One Direction, he contributed to African fundraising events with Comic Relief. In April 2014, Malik donated his guitar to the Kean's Children Fund in Dundee, Scotland; the charity's founder, Charlie Kean, organised an online auction for the guitar and used the money raised to buy iPads for the children's ward at Ninewells. In March 2016, Malik bought a box at Bradford City for underprivileged children to watch football, named after his maternal grandfather Walter Brannan. In January 2020, Malik donated £10,000 toward a five-year-old girl's medical treatment through GoFundMe page her mother made to raise money.

In May and June 2020, Malik expressed support for the Black Lives Matter movement by sharing links to petitions and donating to the George Floyd memorial fund. During the 2014 Israel–Gaza conflict, Malik posted the message "#FreePalestine" on Twitter, causing him to receive angry responses and death threats online.

On 8 November 2022, Malik wrote a public letter to British Prime Minister Rishi Sunak, where he urged him to widen the access to free school meals during the cost of living crisis.

Personal life
Raised as a Muslim, Malik speaks English and Urdu and can read Arabic. In the past, he was a target of anti-Muslim attacks.  In 2017, Malik stated that he identified as a non-practising Muslim and did not want to be defined by his religion or cultural background. In November 2018, he told British Vogue that he no longer considered himself a Muslim.

Malik has openly spoken about suffering from an eating disorder while in One Direction, which he attributed to the overwhelming workload and pace of life on tour. He has also spoken about suffering from anxiety and lack of confidence, especially before live solo performances, having cancelled multiple concerts after experiencing "the worst anxiety" of his career.

Malik is a lifelong supporter of Bradford City A.F.C. He owns an apartment in SoHo, Manhattan, and previously owned homes in Los Angeles and London, both of which he sold in 2018.

 Relationships 
Malik began dating English singer Perrie Edwards of the band Little Mix in December 2011; they became engaged in August 2013 but broke up in August 2015.

Malik began an on-again, off-again relationship with American model Gigi Hadid in late 2015. Hadid starred in his music video for "Pillowtalk", and the pair appeared together on the August 2017 cover of Vogue. In 2017, Hadid photographed them both for a Versace campaign. Malik and Hadid welcomed their first child, a daughter, in September 2020. The family spent a majority of their time at their residence on a working farm in rural Bucks County, Pennsylvania, where Malik tended to horses and cows and Hadid's mother Yolanda and sister Bella also own land. Malik and Hadid ended their relationship in October 2021, after Hadid's mother accused him of striking her; Malik entered a no contest plea to four charges of harassment. Court papers stated that Malik "grabbed and shoved her into a dresser causing mental anguish and physical pain" and said "lewd, lascivious, threatening or obscene words". He was sentenced by a Pennsylvania court to 360 days of probation and completion of anger management and domestic violence education programmes.

Artistry

Malik cites urban music as his main musical influence, having grown up predominantly with R&B, hip hop, and reggae, as well as bop and Bollywood music. He was influenced by his father's urban records, including those by Nusrat Fateh Ali Khan, R. Kelly, Usher, Donell Jones, Prince, 2Pac, Biggie, Gregory Isaacs, Yellowman and Chris Brown. Malik originally auditioned to be a solo R&B singer before joining One Direction. His R&B singing style stood out from the band's pop rock style; he later cited creative differences as another reason for leaving the band. His solo work leans towards R&B, alternative R&B and electropop, and occasionally other genres, such as electro-R&B dance music ("Like I Would"), hip hop ("Pillowtalk" remix), neo-soul ("Truth"), reggae ("Do Something Good"), and Qawwali ghazal ("Flower", where he uses Qawwali vocal techniques such as vocal elisions and warbling).

Malik possesses a wide tenor vocal range and is known for his belting and falsetto techniques and high notes.An in-depth music theory analysis of Zayn Malik's 'Pillowtalk', Classic FM (10 February 2016) He was regarded by Jamieson Cox in Time as One Direction's strongest singer. Brad Nelson of The Guardian wrote, "He was one of the more accomplished vocalists of the group, exhibiting the widest range. He mostly inhabited a silvery, full-bodied tenor, similar to but more sharp and precise than Harry Styles' smoky warble", asserting that his departure would leave "a void of vocal agility".

Public image

Malik was known as the "Bradford Bad Boy" of One Direction due to his mischievous behaviour, scandals, tattoos, graffiti art, and rock star hairstyles. Malik had been a fan of tattoos since before X Factor, stating that he likes getting them and enjoys "the whole culture behind them". He revealed his first tattoo on his Twitter account, his maternal grandfather's name in Arabic: والتر (Walter). Since then, Malik has gotten several more tattoos. Discussing his possible solo career after leaving the band, Billboard editor Joe Lynch described him as "the quiet one in the group ... never the one to grab the spotlight during interviews. He typically saved his words for the songs, not for media soundbytes."

In Pakistan, Malik is often listed among notable Pakistanis of the diaspora. In 2011, he was ranked number 27 on Glamours "World's Sexiest Men" list. In 2014, Malik was voted British GQs best dressed male. In 2015, he was voted the "Sexiest Male in Pop" in a poll by British radio network Capital, voted as the "World's Sexiest Asian Man" based on a worldwide poll by the British newspaper Eastern Eye, voted second place in a poll of the "World's top ten bachelors" by Manchester's Crown Clinic, and ranked number six on MTV's "50 sexiest men alive" list. In 2016, he ranked fifth on Glamour magazine's "100 Sexiest Men" list.

DiscographyMind of Mine (2016)Icarus Falls (2018)Nobody Is Listening'' (2021)

Filmography

Awards and nominations

See also
List of British Pakistanis

References

External links

 
 

 
1993 births
Living people
21st-century English singers
Alternative R&B musicians
British contemporary R&B singers
British former Muslims
British musicians of Pakistani descent
English male singer-songwriters
English people of Irish descent
English people of Pakistani descent
English philanthropists
English pop singers
English tenors
Musicians from Bradford
One Direction members
People convicted of harassment
RCA Records artists
Syco Music artists